Gudian may refer to the following locations in China:

Gudian, Hebei (固店镇), town in Wangdu County
Gudian, Shanxi (古店镇), town in Nanjiao District, Datong
Gudian railway station (古店站), station on the Beijing–Baotou Railway in Datong
Gudian Township, Anhui (古店乡), in Fengtai County
Gudian Township, Sichuan (古店乡), in Zhongjiang County